This is a list of awards and nominations received by English actor and filmmaker Gary Oldman (b. 1958).

Major associations

Academy Awards

British Academy Film Awards

Primetime Emmy Awards

Golden Globe Awards

Screen Actors Guild Awards

Other awards and nominations

Annie Awards

Australian Academy of Cinema and Television Arts Awards

British Independent Film Awards

Empire Awards

London Film Critics' Circle

Golden Raspberry Awards

Independent Spirit Awards

Satellite Awards

Saturn Awards

Film critic awards

Festival awards

See also
 Gary Oldman filmography

References

Awards and nominations
Lists of awards received by British actor